refers to a series of ceremonies in Sōtō Zen Buddhism wherein a unsui receives Dharma transmission, becoming part of the dharma lineage of his or her teacher.

Ceremony
Shiho is done "one-to-one in the abbot's quarters (hojo)".

Shiho, or denpo, is the Dharma transmission ceremony where the student inherits the Dharma, and is empowered to transmit the lineage. In the denpo ceremony, the student becomes an ancestor of the tradition and receives a robe and bowl, among other objects.

During the denpo ceremony the student receives a Shoshike certificate, which grants the power to perform Jukai, and the documents known as the "three regalia of transmission":

The Sōtō-shu also confers inka shōmyō (or inshō) "[granting] the seal of approval to a realization of enlightenment", upon students. This is an 

In the White Plum Asanga, a shiho ceremony can last anywhere from one to three weeks. Prior to dharma transmission,  transmission of the precepts from master to disciple, known as denkai, takes place, where the master confirms that the student is actualizing the precepts in his/her day-to-day life. In this ceremony the student "...become[s] the blood of the Buddha."

Status
In the emerging western Zen-practice, after following completion of these ceremonies the teacher becomes independent.

This is quite distinct from the actual practice in Japanese Sōtō-zen:

To supervise training monks, further qualifications are required:
 However, in some Western Zen Centers, such as the San Francisco Zen Center, unsui in the process of achieving Dharma Transmission (Shiho), do in fact spend a number of years in a monastic training hall (Tassajara Monastery), undergoing apprenticeship. So in many ways, the San Francisco Zen Center has combined Shiho with Sanzen dojo shike, into a single transmission process.

See also
Dharma transmission
Zen ranks and hierarchy
Mushi dokugo
Jukai

References

Web references

Sources

External links 
 Roshi and His Teachers, Dharma Transmission,and the Rochester Zen Center Lineage Roshi Bodhin Kjolhede discusses lineage and Dharma transmission.
 Coming Down from the Zen Clouds:A Critique of the Current State of American Zen Stuart Lachs criticizes Dharma transmission in Zen
  Ten points to keep in mind about dharma transmission Abbot Muho clarifies the meaning of Shihō in Japanese Sōtō Zen

Zen